Urban Hammar (born 12 August 1961) is a Swedish retired football midfielder and later manager.

References

1961 births
Living people
Swedish footballers
Örebro SK players
AIK Fotboll players
Association football midfielders
Swedish football managers
Örebro SK managers
Allsvenskan managers